Summer of My German Soldier is a 1978 American television film based on the 1973 novel of the same name written by Bette Greene. Set during World War II, it stars Kristy McNichol as a Jewish-American girl and Bruce Davison as the German prisoner of war whom she befriends.

Plot
Twelve-year-old Patty Bergen lives in the small American town of Jenkinsville, Georgia, during World War II. Patty's family owns the local clothing and general supplies store, in which Patty occasionally works.  Patty's abusive father and uncaring mother have little time for her, instead favoring her younger sister Sharon.  However, Patty does have a friend in Ruth, the family's black, middle-aged housekeeper.

The U.S. government opens a prisoner-of-war (POW) camp for captured German soldiers in the town. One day, Patty meets one of the POWs - Anton Friedrich Reiker (one of the few prisoners able to speak English), when the POWs are allowed to buy supplies from her family's store.  Soon after, Anton escapes from the POW camp for Nazis and is on the run. He is about to escape on a train when Patty sees him and scuppers his plans.  Rather than inform the authorities, Patty hides the young soldier in some abandoned rooms above the family's disused garage and brings him food. Anton shows Patty a warmth and respect that she never had from her cold family and the two become close friends.

Anton is almost exposed when he sees Patty's father beating her one day and nobly runs out of hiding to protect her, but she shouts for him to go back before he is seen.  However, Ruth sees Anton. She does not approve of Patty harboring him, but agrees to keep her secret and helps by giving Anton food.  Before long, the FBI begins conducting a thorough search of the town looking for Anton.  When they call at the Bergens' home, Patty runs out to the garage to warn Anton that he must leave immediately or he will be caught.  Anton flees from the garage after thanking Patty for her help and gives her a valuable ring that belonged to his grandfather.  However, while trying to leave the town that night, the FBI finds Anton and they are forced to shoot him dead while he is trying to escape. The FBI return to the Bergens' house that night and relay the news of Anton's death to Patty, who is utterly devastated.

Appalled to hear that his own daughter aided a Nazi prisoner, her father virtually disowns her and tells her that she is dead to him. She is also  feels alienated by the townsfolk who view her as a traitor.  The only person who still talks to her is Ruth, who has now been fired from her job as housekeeper for keeping the secret of an escaped Nazi at the home. Ruth tries to comfort Patty in her grief and tells the townsfolk to leave Patty alone as only God has the right to stand in judgment of her.

Cast
Kristy McNichol as Patty Bergen
Bruce Davison as Anton Reiker
Esther Rolle as Ruth
Michael Constantine as Harry Bergen
Barbara Barrie as Mrs. Bergen
James Noble as Pierce
Robyn Lively as Sharon Bergen
Margaret Hall as Sister Parker
Anne Haney as Mrs. Benn
Sonny Shroyer as McFee
Jane Hickey as Edna Louise
Mary Nell Santacroce as Gussie Mae
Roy Morris as Freddy
William Ovell as Mayor Holderness
J. Don Ferguson as Mr. Jackson

Awards
Summer of My German Soldier was nominated for three Emmy awards in 1979, including Best Drama or Comedy Special, Outstanding Writing for a Limited Series or Special, and actress Esther Rolle was nominated and won the award for Best Supporting Actress for her portrayal of Ruth.

Differences from the novel
The film differs from the original 1973 novel in various ways:

 In the novel, Jenkinsville is set in Arkansas. In the film, the town is set in Georgia.
 At the end of the novel, Patty is sent to reform school for aiding an escaped POW. In the film, it is stated that she will be released into the custody of her parents following her trial.
 At the end of the novel, Patty plans to one day go and visit Anton's mother in Germany after the war is over (and she sets out to do just that in the novel's sequel Morning Is a Long Time Coming). In the film, Anton tells Patty that his mother died when she was visiting Dresden.
 In the novel, Anton escapes from Jenkinsville and makes it to New York City where he is discovered and shot while trying to escape. In the film, Anton is shot before he manages to leave Jenkinsville.
 The novel introduces more of Patty's family, including her grandparents. However, only her parents and sister are seen in the film.

References

External links 
 
 

1978 television films
1978 films
1978 drama films
American coming-of-age films
American war drama films
Films based on American novels
Films directed by Michael Tuchner
Films scored by Stanley Myers
Films set in Georgia (U.S. state)
Films set on the home front during World War II
Films shot in Georgia (U.S. state)
NBC network original films
Teen war films
World War II prisoner of war films
1970s English-language films
1970s American films